The  is a professional basketball team that competes in the Eastern Conference of the First Division of the Japanese B.League.

Roster

Notable players
Toarlyn Fitzpatrick
Chukwudiebere Maduabum
Yusuke Okada
Juan Pattillo
Justin Reynolds
Rick Rickert
Hirotaka Sato
Logan Stutz
Yuki Yamaguchi

Coaches
Donte Hill
Keita Iwashita
Fujitaka Hiraoka
Kenji Okamura
Tony Garbelotto

Arenas
Adastria Mito Arena
Lily Arena Mito
Tsukuba Capio
Hitachi City Ikenokawa Sakura Arena
Kamisu Bousai Arena

Practice facilities
They practice at the M-Spo Arena in Minamimachi 3chome, Mito.　 M-SpoFacebook

References

2013 establishments in Japan
Basketball teams in Japan
Basketball teams established in 2013
Globis
Sports teams in Ibaraki Prefecture